The superficial cervical lymph nodes are lymph nodes that lie near the surface of the neck.

Some sources state simply that they lie along the external jugular vein, while other sources state that they are only adjacent to the external jugular vein in the posterior triangle, and they are adjacent to the anterior jugular vein in the anterior triangle.

They can be broken down into:
 superficial anterior cervical lymph nodes
 superficial lateral cervical lymph nodes

References

Lymphatics of the head and neck